Global Hotel Alliance (GHA) is the world's largest alliance of hotel brands. Based on the airline alliance model, it was founded in 2004 by four hotel chains, Kempinski, Pan Pacific Hotels and Resorts, Rydges Hotels & Resorts, and Wyndham International. GHA is privately held with the following shareholders: Kempinski Hotels, Pan Pacific Hotels Group, Minor Hotel Group, Corinthia Hotel Group, ASMALLWORLD, and Oracle.  The alliance now encompasses more than 800 upscale and luxury hotels, across 40 brands in 100 countries. GHA uses a shared technology platform for its member brands, and operates a multi-brand loyalty programme, GHA DISCOVERY, which has over 21 million members, as of June 2022.

Through membership in GHA, brands expand their global reach, drive incremental revenue, and reduce dependence on third-party channels, all while maintaining management independence and individual positioning. The award-winning GHA DISCOVERY programme generates approximately $2 billion in revenue and more than eight million room nights annually.

Brands 
As of 2022, GHA's member brands are:

 Anantara Hotels, Resorts & Spas
 Araiya Hotels & Resorts
 Avani Hotels & Resorts
 Campbell Gray Hotels & Resorts
 Capella Hotels & Resorts
 Corinthia Hotels International
 Discovery Destinations
 Divani Collection
 The Doyle Collection
 Elewana Collection
 Fauchon Hospitality
 GLO
 JA Resorts & Hotels
 Kempinski
 The Leela Palaces, Hotels and Resorts
 Lungarno Collection
 Marco Polo Hotels
 Mysk by Shaza
 NH Hotels
 NH Collection
 nhow
 Niccolo
 Nikki Beach
 NUO
 Oaks Hotels, Resorts & Suites
 Outrigger Hotels & Resorts
 Pan Pacific Hotels and Resorts
 Parkroyal
 Parkroyal Collection
 Patina
 The Residence by Cenizaro
 The Set Collection
 Shaza Hotels
 The Sukhothai Hotels & Resorts
 Sun International
 Tivoli
 Ultratravel Collection
 Viceroy

Anantara Hotels, Resorts & Spas 
Anantara are luxury resorts and spas based in Bangkok, Thailand. The company was founded in 2001 and they currently operate 28 resorts across Asia Pacific and the Middle East with their spa brand expanding into Africa.

Avani Hotels & Resorts 
Avani Hotels & Resorts are luxury hotels and resorts across Asia. As of 2021, they operate 34 properties.

Corinthia 
Corinthia Hotels International is a luxury hotel brand founded in Malta. They currently operate 9 hotels across Europe.

Divani Collection Hotels 
Divani Collection is a luxury hotel brand founded in Thessaly (Greece), in 1958. They currently operate 7 hotels across Greece.

The Doyle Collection 
The Doyle Collection is a group of luxury hotels founded in 1999. The collection is made up of 8 hotels in 5 cities across Ireland, the UK, and the US.

Elewana Collection
Elewana Collection is a brand of Minor Hotels.

Fauchon Hospitality
Part of the Fauchon group, it operates the Fauchon L'hôtel in Paris.

GLO Hotels 

GLO Hotels, a part of the Kamp Group Ltd., are a Finnish brand that currently operate 4 hotels across Finland.

JA Resorts & Hotels
JA Resorts & Hotels are based in Dubai and operate properties across the Middle East. The Hatta Fort Hotel is managed by JA Resorts & Hotels.

Kempinski 
Kempinski is Europe's oldest luxury hotel brand and was founded in Germany in 1897. They currently operate 73 five star hotels across 30 countries. Kempinski is also a founding member of GHA.

The Leela Palaces, Hotels and Resorts 
The Leela Palaces, Hotels and Resorts is a luxury hospitality group founded in India. The group currently consists of 7 luxury resorts and hotels across India.

Lungarno Collection 
The Lungarno Collection is an Italian brand of luxury hotels, residences and villas owned by the Ferragamo family. They currently operate 6 properties across Italy.

Marco Polo Hotels 
Marco Polo Hotels is a hotel chain based in Hong Kong. They currently operate 13 hotels in the Asia Pacific region.

NH Hotels

NH Hotels is an upscale and midscale hotel chain based in Spain and with properties across Europe, the Americas, and the Middle East.

NH Collection

NH Collection is a Premium upper-upscale hotel chain based in Spain with hotels in iconic buildings located in the major cities of Europe, Latin America and the Middle East.

nhow

nhow is an upper-upscale chain based in Spain with lifestyle hotels in Europe and Latin America.

Nikki Beach
Nikki Beach is a chain of five luxury hotels, started by the American entrepreneur Jack Penrod.

Oaks Hotels, Resorts & Suites
Oaks Hotels, Resorts & Suites is a brand of Minor Hotels with properties in Oceania, the Middle East and India.

Outrigger Hotels & Resorts
Outrigger Hotels & Resorts is a Honolulu-based luxury hotel chain with properties in Hawaii and Asia Pacific.

Pan Pacific Hotels and Resorts 
Pan Pacific Hotels and Resorts is a luxury hotel and resort brand which was founded in 1976 and is based in Singapore. It currently operates hotels across Asia, Australia and North America.

PARKROYAL Collection

PARKROYAL Collection is based in Singapore and has hotels across Asia that are iconic in design with a sense of responsibility toward the environment.

PARKROYAL Hotels & Resorts 
PARKROYAL Hotels & Resorts, part of the Pan Pacific Hotels Group, are a hotel brand who currently operate hotels, resorts and serviced suites across Asia and Australia, including those which are still underway.

The Residence by Cenizaro

The Residence by Cenizaro has widely acclaimed resorts in the Maldives, Mauritius and Tunisia.

The Set Collection

The Set Collection has iconic luxury properties in key cities across Europe.

Shaza Hotels 
Shaza Hotels is a luxury five star hotel chain which operates luxury hotels in Saudi Arabia.

The Sukhothai Hotels & Resorts
The Sukhothai Hotels & Resorts is owned by HKR International and operates The Sukhothai Bangkok hotel and one in Shanghai.

Sun International

Sun International is a premiere hotel chain based in South Africa with hotels across the country.

Tivoli Hotels & Resorts 
Tivoli Hotels & Resorts is a four and five star hotel chain of Minor Hotels that was established in 1991. Tivoli operates hotels and resorts across Europe and South America.

Ultratravel Collection 
The Ultratravel Collection, founded in 2013, is an exclusive association of independent "ultra luxury" hotel brands and properties.

See also

References

External links
 

Hospitality companies
Hospitality companies of the United Arab Emirates
Organisations based in Dubai
Organizations established in 2004